David James Furnish (born 25 October 1962) is a Canadian filmmaker and former advertising executive. He is married to English singer, pianist and composer Sir Elton John.

Early life and education
David Furnish was born in Toronto, Ontario, the son of Gladys and Jack Furnish, a director at the Bristol-Myers pharmaceutical company. He has an older brother, John, and a younger brother, Peter. Furnish graduated from the Sir John A. Macdonald Collegiate Institute in 1981 and received an Honours Bachelor of Business Administration (HBA) from the Ivey Business School at the University of Western Ontario in London, Ontario in 1985.

Career 
After graduation, he was recruited by the advertising agency Ogilvy & Mather Canada in Toronto. At 27, he asked his firm to transfer him to their UK principal offices in London. Furnish flourished in England, becoming the firm’s youngest Director of Account Services.

Furnish is co-chief of Rocket Pictures along with his husband, Sir Elton John. Furnish serves on the board of the Elton John AIDS Foundation, attending fundraisers and other events in support of that cause.

Furnish is a contributing editor for Tatler magazine and also is a regular columnist for Interview and GQ.

In 2015, he was named one of GQs 50 best dressed men in Britain.

In June 2019, to mark the 50th anniversary of the Stonewall riots, Queerty named him, along with John, as one of the Pride50 "trailblazing individuals who actively ensure society remains moving towards equality, acceptance and dignity for all queer people".

Personal life 
Furnish began a relationship with singer Elton John in 1993. John proposed to Furnish in May 2005 at a dinner party with friends and family at one of their homes in Old Windsor. Furnish and John entered into a civil partnership on 21 December 2005, the first day that civil partnerships could be performed in England, in the town of Windsor, Berkshire. Their first child, son Zachary Jackson Levon Furnish-John, was born on 25 December 2010 in California via surrogacy. On 11 January 2013, the couple's second son, Elijah Joseph Daniel Furnish-John, was born through the same surrogate. After same-sex marriage became legal in England and Wales in March 2014, Furnish and John retroactively converted their civil partnership into a marriage and marked the occasion with a ceremony in Windsor on 21 December 2014, the ninth anniversary of their civil partnership.

In 2016, Furnish sought an anonymised privacy injunction in the case PJS v News Group Newspapers Ltd.

Filmography
Elton John: Tantrums & Tiaras; director (1997)
Women Talking Dirty; producer (1999)
Desert Flower; co-producer (1999)
Kofi Annan: Center of the Storm; executive producer (2002)
Fame and Fashion:  Inside Gucci – Sex and Fashion; director, script writer (2002)
Fame and Fashion:  Inside Versace – Fame and Fashion; director, script writer (2002)
It's a Boy Girl Thing; producer (2006)
Pride and Predator; producer (announced 2009)
Gnomeo & Juliet; producer (2011)
Billy Elliot the Musical Live; executive producer (2014)
Virtuoso; executive producer (2015)
Sherlock Gnomes; producer (2018)
Rocketman; producer (2019)
 Goodbye Yellow Brick Road: The Final Elton John Performances and the Years That Made His Legend; co-director and producer (announced 2022)

Television
Spectacle: Elvis Costello with...; producer (2008)

Theatre
Billy Elliot the Musical;  executive producer (March 2005).

References

Further reading
"Elton's Rocket Man". (1 Sept. 2001). The Observer.
"Elton and David to tie the knot". (25 November 2005). iAfrica.com.
"An Ideal Husband". (March 2006). Toronto Life.
"Wherefore art thou 'Gnomeo'?". (20 August 2008) Hollywood Reporter.
"News - EltonJohn.com". (16 January 2013).

External links

 

1962 births
Businesspeople from London
Businesspeople from Toronto
Canadian expatriates in England
Film producers from Ontario
Elton John
Film directors from London
Film directors from Toronto
Canadian LGBT businesspeople
LGBT film producers
Living people
People named in the Pandora Papers
University of Western Ontario alumni
20th-century Canadian LGBT people
21st-century Canadian LGBT people
Canadian gay men